Olivier Myny (born 10 November 1994) is a Belgian professional footballer who plays as a forward for Dender EH.

Career
In May 2018, Myny moved from Waasland-Beveren to OH Leuven. He had signed for 3 seasons.

Investigation
In October 2018, Myny was interviewed as part of investigations following the 2017–2019 Belgian football fraud scandal. He was released by the investigating judge. In May 2019, Walter Mortelmans denied that he had tried to influence Myny to distort the match in Mechelen, which had been lost 2-0. His representative Jesse De Preter said a few days later that Myny had nothing to do with the match-fixing. Three player agents were found guilty of disregarding of competition regulations in June 2019. Myny was released. In July 2019, Myny's intermediary "Mortelmans" was banned for three years, two of which were deferred.

References

External links

1994 births
Living people
Belgian footballers
K.S.V. Roeselare players
S.K. Beveren players
Oud-Heverlee Leuven players
Royal Excel Mouscron players
F.C.V. Dender E.H. players
Belgian Pro League players
Challenger Pro League players
Association football defenders